Zégo is a town in southern Ivory Coast. It is a sub-prefecture of Divo Department in Lôh-Djiboua Region, Gôh-Djiboua District.

Zégo was a commune until March 2012, when it became one of 1126 communes nationwide that were abolished.

In 2014, the population of the sub-prefecture of Zégo was 24,994.

Villages
The 8 villages of the sub-prefecture of Zégo and their population in 2014 are:
 Apparagra (1 626)
 Bokasso (2 294)
 Daako (3 057)
 Goudi (9 507)
 Kaouadio Bahkro (4 625)
 Kouassi Kouamékro (671)
 Zégo (2 663)
 Zégo Konankro (551)

References

Sub-prefectures of Lôh-Djiboua
Former communes of Ivory Coast